Peter Gossage (22 October 1946-30 July 2016) was a New Zealand author and illustrator. Known for his children's picture books based on Māori mythology.

Biography

Gossage was born in Remuera, Auckland, on 22 October 1946. Gossage's first book published in 1975 was How Maui Found His Mother. In March 1980, Gossage began working at the Auckland War Memorial Museum as a display artist.

Books

 How Maui Slowed the Sun

References

External links
Peter Gossage - Penguin Books New Zealand

New Zealand children's book illustrators
New Zealand children's writers
New Zealand illustrators
1946 births
New Zealand writers
2016 deaths
People associated with the Auckland War Memorial Museum